Rosichonariefi's bent-toed gecko (Cyrtodactylus rosichonarieforum) is a species of lizard in the family Gekkonidae. The species is endemic to the island of Natuna Besar in Indonesia.

Etymology
The specific name – rosichonarieforum (masculine, genitive, plural) – is in honor of Rosichon Ubaidillah and Ahmad Jauhar Arief, both of whom are Indonesian scientists.

Description

Reproduction
The mode of reproduction of C. rosichonarieforum is unknown.

References

Further reading
Amarasinghe AA, Riyanto A, Mumpuni, Grismer LL (2020). "A new bent-toed gecko species of the genus Cyrtodactylus Gray, 1827 (Squamata: Gekkonidae) from the West Bali National Park, Bali, Indonesia". Taprobanica 9 (1): 59–70. (Cyrtodactylus rosichonarieforum, corrected name, p. 66).
Riyanto A, Grismer LL, Wood PL Jr (2015). "Cyrtodactylus rosichonariefi sp. nov. (Squamata: Gekkonidae), a new swamp-dwelling bent-toed gecko from Bunguran Island (Great Natuna), Indonesia". Zootaxa 3964 (1): 114–124. ("Cyrtodactylus rosichonariefi [sic]", new species).

Cyrtodactylus
Reptiles described in 2015